Bel Air North is a census-designated place (CDP) in Harford County, Maryland, United States. It is situated immediately north of (and excludes) the incorporated town of Bel Air. As of the 2010 census, the CDP population was 30,568, up from 25,798 in 2000.

Geography
Bel Air North is located in west-central Harford County at  (39.550439, −76.361781). It is bordered to the south by the town of Bel Air and the Bel Air South CDP. It is bordered to the southwest by Fallston. Maryland Route 23 and Prospect Mill Road form the northern border of Bel Air North. East of Bel Air, Maryland Route 22 (Churchville Road) separates Bel Air North from Bel Air South, while Baltimore Pike performs that function west of Bel Air. Winters Run forms the southwest border of the CDP, separating Bel Air North from Fallston.

U.S. Route 1 passes through the central part of the CDP as it bypasses Bel Air to the north. Route 1 leads northeast  to the Conowingo Dam across the Susquehanna River and southwest  to Baltimore.

Demographics

As of the census of 2000, there were 25,798 people, 8,716 households, and 7,190 families residing in the CDP. The racial makeup of the CDP was 94.96% White, 2.22% African American, 0.12% Native American, 1.61% Asian, 0.02% Pacific Islander, 0.27% from other races, and 0.79% from two or more races. Hispanic or Latino of any race were 1.10% of the population.

There were 8,716 households, out of which 48.3% had children under the age of 18 living with them, 72.0% were married couples living together, 8.2% had a female householder with no husband present, and 17.5% were non-families. 14.6% of all households were made up of individuals, and 5.3% had someone living alone who was 65 years of age or older. The average household size was 2.94 and the average family size was 3.28.

In the CDP, the population was spread out, with 31.4% under the age of 18, 5.9% from 18 to 24, 32.3% from 25 to 44, 22.3% from 45 to 64, and 8.1% who were 65 years of age or older. The median age was 35 years. For every 100 females, there were 94.4 males. For every 100 females age 18 and over, there were 90.5 males.

The median income for a household in the CDP was $86,881, and the median income for a family was $94,119. Males had a median income of $54,381 versus $32,521 for females. The per capita income for the CDP was $26,726. About 1.2% of families and 1.7% of the population were below the poverty line, including 1.6% of those under age 18 and 3.4% of those age 65 or over.

References

Census-designated places in Harford County, Maryland
Former census-designated places in Maryland